Grandstand for General Staff (German: Der Feldherrnhügel) is a 1926 Austrian-German silent comedy film directed by Hans Otto and Erich Schönfelder and starring Alexander Roda Roda, Harry Liedtke and Olga Tschechowa. It is based on a play of the same name.

Cast
Alexander Roda Roda as Korpskomandant 
Robert Valberg as Erzherzog 
Frederick Schrecker as Regimentsarzt 
Harry Liedtke as Rittmeister Jennewein 
Maria Mindzenty as Komptesse Lilly 
Olga Tschechowa as Gräfin Landieren 
Hansi Niese as Frau Oberst von Leukfeld 
Karl Forest as Feldmarschalleutnant 
Hans Moser as Regimentsschneider 
Iván Petrovich as Colonel Esterhazy
Hans Marr
Mizzi Zwerenz
Hans Junkermann
Lupu Pick

See also
Grandstand for General Staff (1932)
Grandstand for General Staff (1953)

References

External links

1926 films
Austrian silent feature films
Films of the Weimar Republic
German silent feature films
Films directed by Hans Otto
Films directed by Erich Schönfelder
Austrian films based on plays
German films based on plays
German black-and-white films
1926 comedy films
German comedy films
Austrian comedy films
Films set in the 1900s
Films set in Austria
Military humor in film
UFA GmbH films
1920s German-language films
Silent comedy films
1920s German films